The Travelette is a sub-model of the International Harvester series of light-duty pickup trucks that was produced from 1957 to 1975. The Travelette was the first factory-production, 6 passenger, crew-cab pickup truck, made by any United States manufacturer.

The Travelette was available in 2 or 4 wheel drive. A 3-door version was available starting in 1957. A 4-door version was available starting in 1961.

Following the 1975 model year, International withdrew its Light Line pickup trucks, ending production of the Travelette.  From 1976 to 1980, it produced the Scout II Terra pickup truck, offered only as a two-door vehicle.

History

3-door cab (A/B series) 
International introduced the Travelette for 1957 production. Based on the newly introduced A-Series pickup truck, the Travelette added a rear seat to the cab by using the body structure of the Travelall wagon (analogous to the full-size SUVs of today), including its second passenger-side door. As with the standard International pickup truck and the Travelall wagon, the Travelette was offered with both rear-wheel drive and 4-wheel drive. 

Alongside the Travelall wagon, the Travelette crew cab followed the development of International light-duty pickup trucks, with International introducing the lightly updated B-Series pickups for 1959.

4-door cab (C/D series, Light Line) 

For 1961, International introduced the redesigned C-series pickups. While the cab shared its structure with the A/B series, in a major design change, a driver-side rear door was added, giving the Travelette four sedan-style doors. While marketed under the Travelette name, the official model designation would change multiple times through the mid-1960s.

For 1969, the Travelette underwent a redesign, as International introduced its Light Line pickups. For 1974, the four-wheel drive configuration was discontinued and the front suspension was redesigned.

Discontinuation 

Marketed primarily as a work vehicle, the model line struggled to compete against the more widely available pickup trucks from Dodge, Ford, and General Motors.  Following the 1973 fuel crisis, sales of International light-duty vehicles collapsed, as the Light Line (pickup, Travelall, Travelette) trucks were far heavier and less fuel-efficient than its "Big Three" counterparts.  Shifting its light-duty resources entirely towards the more competitive International Scout off-road vehicle, International ended sales of all three Light Line vehicles after the 1975 model year, ending sales of non-commercial automobiles entirely after the 1980 model year.  

After the 1980 discontinuation of the Scout II Terra, International exited light-duty pickup production entirely to focus on medium and heavy-duty trucks. From 2004 to 2008, International Harvester's successor company Navistar produced the XT series pickup trucks. (By far) the largest pickup truck ever sold for retail sale in the United States, the CXT and RXT was derived from the medium-duty 7000 and 4000 series (today the HV and MV) and were sold nearly exclusively in a crew-cab configuration.

Legacy 

Designed effectively as a hybrid of the International light-duty pickup truck and its Travelall wagon (SUV), the Travelette was the first factory-produced pickup truck with two rows of seating, later becoming the first pickup truck with four sedan-style doors.  The design was adopted by competitive manufacturers, as Dodge and Ford introduced their own crew-cab pickups in 1963 and 1965, respectively.  General Motors followed suit in 1973; in a fashion similar to International, their crew-cab pickup design was derived from a truck-based wagon (today, SUV).  During the late 1970s, Japanese manufacturers would introduce crew-cab pickup trucks of their own (trading shortened bed length for a four-door cab); while popular in markets around the world, four-door compact pickup trucks would not be introduced in North America until the late 1990s.  

The original 1957-1960 three-door Travelette became a precursor of an additional type of pickup truck design feature.  During the 1970s, American manufacturers introduced two-door extended-cab pickup trucks, sized between two-door standard-cab and four-door crew cab pickup trucks.  In contrast to work-oriented crew cab trucks, extended cab trucks were marketed for both work and personal use; a rear folding seat was available for extra seating or for storage, accessed by folding the front seats forward.  The Light Line was never developed as an extended cab, but Dodge and Ford would introduce the Club Cab and Super Cab in 1973 and 1974, respectively (GM would do so in 1988).  In the late 1990s, rear passenger doors made their returns on extended-cab pickups; initially introduced as rear-hinged doors, front-hinged doors were introduced during the 2010s (effectively creating a shorter-length crew cab).

See also 
 List of International Harvester vehicles
 International Harvester Travelall
 International Light Line pickup

References

Further reading 

 McCormick-International Harvester Collection (Travelette)

International Harvester vehicles
Pickup trucks
Vehicles introduced in 1957
1950s cars
1960s cars
1970s cars